Virbia divisa is a moth in the family Erebidae. It was described by Francis Walker in 1854. It is found in Brazil.

References

Moths described in 1854
divisa